Joan Hess (January 6, 1949 – November 23, 2017) was an American mystery writer, a member of Sisters in Crime, and a former president of the American Crime Writers League. She wrote two popular mystery series: The Claire Malloy Mysteries and The Maggody Mysteries (also called The Arly Hanks Mysteries), and contributed to multiple anthologies and book series, including: Crosswinds, Deadly Allies, Malice Domestic, Sisters in Crime, and The Year's 25 Finest Crime and Mystery Stories. She also wrote the Theo Bloomer mystery series, under the pseudonym Joan Hadley.

Series
The Claire Malloy series is set in Farberville, Arkansas, and centers around Claire Malloy, who owns a small bookstore across from the campus of Farberville College. It has been suggested that Farberville is a stand-in for Fayetteville, Arkansas, with many landmarks, including the University of Arkansas-Fayetteville, Dickson Street, and even well-known local citizens, thinly veiled in the prose.

The Arly Hanks series is set in Maggody, Arkansas, population 755. The main character is Arly Hanks, Maggody's irreverent young female police chief.  The first book of the Arly Hanks series, Malice in Maggody, was the basis for the 1993 CBS television pilot Arly Hanks.

In the Theo Bloomer series the eponymous protagonist, "a dignified offshoot of old Connecticut money and prestige", is a retired bachelor-botanist who formerly worked as a florist. In each book, family obligations take him to an exotic vacation destination, where he becomes embroiled in a mystery: in the first book, he travels to Israel to retrieve his niece, who is staying at a kibbutz hotel, and in the next he accompanies her party to a "luxurious villa" in Montego Bay, Jamaica, as a chaperone.

Awards
Hess has been nominated for the Agatha Award five times and won once, for her 1990 short story "Too Much to Bare".

Personal life
A longtime resident of Fayetteville, Arkansas, Hess lived in Austin, Texas where she died at her home Nov. 23, 2017.

Bibliography

Novels

 Claire Malloy series by Joan Hess

 Strangled Prose
 The Murder at The Murder at the Mimosa Inn
 Dear Miss Demeanor
 A Really Cute Corpse
 A Diet to Die For
 Roll Over and Play Dead
 Death by the Light of the Moon
 Poisoned Pins
 Tickled to Death
 Closely Akin to Murder
 Busy Bodies
 A Holly, Jolly Murder
 A Conventional Corpse
 Out on a Limb
 The Goodbye Body
 Damsels in Distress
 Mummy Dearest
 Deader Homes and Gardens
 Murder as a Second Language
 Pride v. Prejudice

 Maggody series by Joan Hess

 Malice in Maggody
 Mischief in Maggody
 Much Ado in Maggody
 Madness in Maggody
 Mortal Remains in Maggody
 Maggody in Manhattan
 O Little Town of Maggody
 Martians in Maggody
 Miracles in Maggody
 The Maggody Militia
 Misery Loves Maggody
 Murder@maggody.com
 Maggody and the Moonbeams
 Muletrain to Maggody
 Malpractice in Maggody
 The Merry Wives of Maggody

 Theo Bloomer Mystery series by Joan Hadley

 The Night-Blooming Cereus (1986)
 The Deadly Ackee (1988)

Standalone Teenage Romance
 Future Tense (1987)

Short stories

 
 

Maggody Files: Hillbilly Cat
Great Cat Mysteries: An Anthology of Feline Capers (audio edition by Phoenix Books, 1996).
She also has two books of solely her own short stories.

She co-authored Elizabeth Peters' last book, The Painted Queen. After Elizabeth Peters died, Joan Hess completed this last novel in the popular Amelia Peabody series.

Notes

References

1949 births
2017 deaths
20th-century American novelists
21st-century American novelists
Agatha Award winners
American mystery writers
Place of birth missing
American women novelists
Writers from Austin, Texas
Women mystery writers
20th-century American women writers
21st-century American women writers
Novelists from Texas
People from Fayetteville, Arkansas